= Sierra Springs, California =

Unincorporated community in California, United States

Sierra Springs
- Unincorporated community
- Location in California Sierra Springs (the United States)
- Coordinates: 38°42′25″N 120°36′42″W
- Country: United States
- State: California
- County: El Dorado
- Elevation: 3,323 ft (1,013 m)

Sierra Springs is an unincorporated community in El Dorado County, California, United States. It lies at an elevation of 3323 feet (1013 m).
